Teen Spirit may refer to:

 Teen Spirit (deodorant), a deodorant from Colgate-Palmolive
 Teen Spirit (album), a 2001 album by A-Teens
 Teen Spirit (2011 film), a 2011 American television film
 Teen Spirit (EP), a 2016 extended play by Bars and Melody
 Teen Spirit (2018 film), a 2018 American musical drama film
 Teen Spirit: The Tribute to Kurt Cobain, 1996 documentary about Nirvana's lead singer Kurt Cobain

See also
 "Smells Like Teen Spirit", a 1991 song by Nirvana